The Pitchfork Music Festival 2007 was held on July 13 to 15, 2007 at the Union Park, Chicago, United States.

On Friday, all of the performing bands played all the songs from one of their classic albums as a part of Don't Look Back concert series, a collaboration between Pitchfork and British promoters All Tomorrow's Parties. During her set, musician and performance artist Yoko Ono performed "Mulberry," a song about her time in the countryside after the Japanese collapse in World War II, for only the third time in her life, with Thurston Moore from Sonic Youth; Ono had previously performed the song once with her husband John Lennon and once with her son Sean Lennon.

Lineup
Artists listed from latest to earliest set times.

Notes

References

External links

Pitchfork Music Festival
2007 music festivals